George Keith Griffiths (30 December 1927 – August 2015) was an English professional footballer who played as a goalkeeper in the Football League for Chester.

Football career 
Griffiths began his playing career with Rhyl before joining hometown club Chester in the summer of 1955 along with John Devine. His Football League debut followed on 28 September, in a 3–2 win over Carlisle United at Sealand Road.

He was to spend his first two years as second-choice goalkeeper to Bobby Jones before playing regularly in 1957–58. He remained involved in the first team squad the following season but was restricted to just seven league appearances before moving on.

Bibliography

References

1927 births
2015 deaths
Sportspeople from Chester
English footballers
Association football goalkeepers
Rhyl F.C. players
Chester City F.C. players
English Football League players